The New Zealand International Science Festival is a biennial science festival which takes place for six days and involves participation of international keynote speakers.

NZISF-staff produce events, external event organisers, and a range of local and national sponsors and funders.  Up to 40 individual volunteers help run 200 festival events and thousands of visitors from all over New Zealand participate in festival events.  The festivals attract a significant amount of high-profile local, regional and national media coverage, in print, radio and TV. The festival was first held in 1997 and its aim is to celebrate, promote and raise awareness of science, technology and the environment. The festival encourages people and organisations (educational, research, business and community) to participate in the promotion of their work in science and its applications and contributions to society. They also aim to highlight the excellence of achievements in these fields by Dunedin, Otago and New Zealand scientists. Beside private sponsors, core contributors to the festival are the Dunedin City Council, The Community Trust of Otago, and the University of Otago.

Sci Kids

Children are one of the festival's key audiences. The festival is held during the winter school holidays, and most events for kids are free.

References

External links

Festivals in Dunedin
Science festivals
Festivals established in 1997
Science and technology in New Zealand
Science events in New Zealand
1997 establishments in New Zealand